The Daily Plainsman, also referred to as the Plainsman, is a newspaper in Huron, South Dakota.  The paper is owned by the News Media Corporation. It started operation in 1886 and is still in production.

History
The Huron Plainsman started as the Daily Huronite on January 3, 1886. It ran with four to six pages per edition. Being locally owned for almost 100 years, the owners sold the paper to Freedom Newspapers in 1980, which ran it for the next ten years, when they sold to the Omaha World-Herald in 1990. The Omaha paper sold it along with other papers in South Dakota to News Media Corporation in 1998.

References

External links 
Huron Plainsman website

Newspapers published in South Dakota
Huron, South Dakota
Publications established in 1886
1886 establishments in Dakota Territory